John Stephen Michaud (November 24, 1843 – December 22, 1908) was an American prelate of the Roman Catholic Church. He served as bishop of the Diocese of Burlington in Vermont from 1899 until his death in 1908.

Biography

Early life 
John Michaud was born on November 24, 1843, in Burlington, Vermont, to Stephen and Catherine (née Rogan) Michaud. He attended a school run by Reverend Jeremiah O'Callaghan, the first resident priest of Vermont, and served as an altar boy to Bishop Louis De Goesbriand. Michaud worked for several lumber companies in Burlington. 

Michaud later studied at the Bryant and Stratton Commercial College campus in Vermont. In September 1865, he entered the College of Montreal in Montreal, Quebec.  Returning to the United States, Michaud attended Holy Cross College in Worcester, Massachusetts, earning a Bachelor of Arts degree in 1870.  He then went to Saint Joseph's Provincial Seminary in Troy, New York.

Priesthood 
Michaud was ordained to the priesthood for the Diocese of Burlington by Bishop Edgar Wadhams on June 7, 1873. He then served in Newport, Albany, Barton and Lowell, all in Vermont, where he established their first Catholic churches. After recovering from smallpox, Michaud fulfilled other pastoral assignments during the 1870's.  Michaud returned to Burlington in 1879 to build the St. Joseph's Orphanage, completed in 1883. Michaud also performed pastoral work for Vermont parishes in Bennington, North Bennington, Fairfield, Underhill and Charlotte. He was later named pastor of St. Stephen's Parish in Winooski, Vermont. After a sabbatical to Europe, he returned to Vermont in 1885 to become pastor of St. Frances de Sales Parish in Bennington.

Bishop of Burlington 
On May 4, 1892, Michaud was appointed coadjutor bishop of the Diocese of Burlington and titular bishop of Modra by Pope Leo XIII. He received his episcopal consecration on June 29, 1892, from Archbishop John Williams, with Bishops Denis Bradley and Henry Gabriels serving as co-consecrators. He automatically became the second bishop of Burlington upon Bishop De Goesbriand death on November 3, 1899. 

During his tenure, Michaud completed the Cathedral Church, built the Fanny Allen Hospital in Burlington and staffed it with the Religious Hospitalers of St. Joseph. The Sisters of Charity of Providence opened another new hospital in St. Johnsbury, Vermont; the Loretto Home for the Aged in Rutland, Vermont, was served by the Sisters of St. Joseph. In 1904, Michaud invited the Society of Saint Edmund to establish Saint Michael's College in Colchester, Vermont. In 1905, the Daughters of Charity of the Sacred Heart of Jesus came to Newport, where they opened a mission to serve as teachers, nurses and catechists for the Northeast Kingdom region of the state.

Death 
John Michaud died on December 22, 1908, in New York City at age 63. He is buried at Resurrection Park in South Burlington.  During his tenure, Michaud expanded the number of churches in the diocese from 72 to 94. There were 75,000 Catholics, 102 priests, 286 religious sisters, and 20 parochial schools serving some 7000 students.

See also

References

1843 births
1908 deaths
College of the Holy Cross alumni
Roman Catholic bishops of Burlington
19th-century Roman Catholic bishops in the United States
20th-century Roman Catholic bishops in the United States
Bryant and Stratton College alumni